Mozena is a genus of leaf-footed bugs in the family Coreidae. There are more than 30 described species in Mozena.

Species
These 31 species belong to the genus Mozena:

 Mozena acantha (Dallas, 1852)
 Mozena affinis (Dallas, 1852)
 Mozena alata Distant, 1900
 Mozena arizonensis Ruckes, 1955
 Mozena atra Brailovsky & Barrera, 2001
 Mozena auricularia Brailovsky, 1999
 Mozena brunnicornis (Herrich-Schäffer, 1840)
 Mozena buenoi Hussey, 1958
 Mozena gaumeri Distant, 1890
 Mozena guanacastela Brailovsky, 1999
 Mozena hector Van Duzee, 1923
 Mozena jansoni (Scott, 1882)
 Mozena lineolata (Herrich-Schäffer, 1840)
 Mozena lunata (Burmeister, 1835)
 Mozena lurida (Dallas, 1852)
 Mozena lutea (Herrich-Schäffer, 1840)
 Mozena nestor (Stål, 1862)
 Mozena nigricornis Stål, 1870
 Mozena nogueirana Brailovsky & Barrera, 2001
 Mozena obesa Montandon, 1899
 Mozena obtusa Uhler, 1876
 Mozena pallisteri Ruckes, 1955
 Mozena pardalota Brailovsky & Barrera, 2001
 Mozena perezae Brailovsky & Barrera, 2001
 Mozena preclara Brailovsky & Barrera, 2001
 Mozena presigna Brailovsky & Barrera, 2001
 Mozena rufula Van Duzee, 1923
 Mozena scrupulosa (Stål, 1862)
 Mozena tomentosa Ruckes, 1955
 Mozena tyttha Brailovsky, 1999
 Mozena ventralis (Mayr, 1865)

References

Further reading

External links

 

Articles created by Qbugbot
Nematopodini
Coreidae genera